The Eleven Naqshbandi principles or the "rules or secrets of the Naqshbandi", known in Persian as the kalimat-i qudsiya ("sacred words" or "virtuous words"), are a system of principles and guidelines used as spiritual exercises, or to encourage certain preferred states of being, in the Naqshbandi Sufi order of Islamic mysticism.

Background
There were originally eight principles formulated by the Central Asian Sufi teacher Abdul Khaliq Gajadwani (died 1179), the last three of the eleven being added later by Baha-ud-Din Naqshband Bukhari (1318–1389), founder of the Naqshbandi Order. Both were Khwajagan (Masters) of the Sufi tariqah (path, way or method).

These principles are designed to be borne in mind and used as spiritual practices or exercises in the Naqshbandi system of spiritual development. They are carried out under individual tuition, expertly prescribed, monitored for changes, and carefully adjusted by a teacher, rather than being automatically performed.

The principles have been brought to the attention of contemporary Western audiences through the works of the writers Idries Shah, John G. Bennett, Omar Ali-Shah and J. Spencer Trimingham. The exercises were an important aspect of Omar Ali-Shah's work with groups in the modern Naqshbandi tradition in the West. For instance, one of Ali-Shah's books of edited transcripts, The Rules or Secrets of the Naqshbandi Order, was devoted to this subject.

The Eleven principles
The Eleven principles are as follows, shown in the order used by Idries Shah in A Perfumed Scorpion, which differs slightly (in items 5 to 8) from the order presented by Omar Ali-Shah:

1. Hush dar dam (or hosh dar dam) — awareness of breathing
Being aware or conscious of one's breathing. Breathing deeply in a natural rhythm without being preoccupied by breathing. Inhaling and exhaling whilst in remembrance of God.

2. Nazar ba kadam (or nazar bar qadam) — watching over the steps
Watching over one's steps, ie being aware of one's intention. Paying attention and not being distracted from one's goal, maintaining awareness and being open to opportunities, so that one does the right thing at the right time.

3. Safar dar watan — travelling in the Homeland
Making an interior journey, ie inside oneself, observing oneself in a detached and not overly-critical manner, learning from one's errors and travelling from blameworthy to praiseworthy qualities.

4. Khilwat dar anjuman (or khalwat dar anjuman) — retirement in company
Developing the ability to detach from and distance oneself from external noise, disturbance and confusion when in company, and remain tranquil, perhaps with the aid of a zikr, an exercise in remembrance of God. Also being able to re-attach one's attention to the outward when necessary. Though outwardly the Sufi is in the world, inwardly he or she is with God.

5. Yad kardan (or yad kard) — remembering, recollecting exercises
Remembering experiences one has had and that one is a part of the Tradition from which one may draw positive energy and derive strength. Using inner or vocalized zikr, remembrance or "making mention" of the Divine names, to remain attentive and alert, and so that the heart becomes aware of the presence of Truth (Al Haqq).

6. Baaz gasht (or baz gasht) — restraint
Being self-disciplined, for example cultivating the quality of patience, keeping one's thoughts from straying when repeating the Shahada (the declaration of the Oneness of God and the acceptance of Muhammad as his prophet), being repentant and returning to righteousness.

7. Neegar dashtan (or nigah dasht) — watchfulness, use of special faculties
Concentrating on the presence of God. Being alert, watchful for and open to subtle perceptions, positive energy, positive opportunity and positive impacts. Being watchful over passing thoughts.

8. Yad dashtan (or yad dasht) — keeping of the memory, sensing of the being and the body
Sensing one's being and one's body, recalling positive memories and positive experiences.

9. Ukufi zamani (or wuquf-e zamani) — time-halt (or pause)
Suspending intellect, judgement, preconceptions and conditioned thought. Reprising one's thoughts and actions. Accounting for how one's time is spent, being thankful for acts of righteousness and asking forgiveness for wrongdoing.

10. Ukufi adadi (or wuquf-e adadi) — number-halt (or pause)
Carrying out exercises involving numbers, such as the awareness of the number of repetitions when carrying out one's silent heart zikr exercise, and also certain forms of counting using the Abjad system.

11. Ukufi qalbi (or wuquf-e qalbi) — heart-halt (or pause) or visualisation
Visualising one's heart (Qalb), perhaps with the name of God inscribed on it, and identifying with Truth or with God.

See also
 Abdul Khaliq Gajadwani
 Baha-ud-Din Naqshband Bukhari
 Spiritual practice

Notes

References
  Editor: Hayter, Augy.
 
 
  First published by Octagon Press in 1956.
  2nd revised edition. First published 1971.

Further reading

General background
  First published 1964.

External links
 11 Principle of the Naqshbandi Sufi Way at NurMuhammad.com
 The Eleven Principles of the Naqshbandi Path at GoldenSufi.org
 Eleven Principles Of The Naqshbandi Sufi Order at University of Georgia
 Eleven Secrets or Guidelines for Spiritual Development at Instituto Alef
 The Principles of the Naqshbandi Way at Naqshbandi.org (the first eight principles)

Naqshbandi order
Spiritual practice
Sufi psychology
Sufism